Hope of Heaven is a 1938 novel by John O'Hara. It tells the story of struggling screenwriter in his mid-30s, living in Hollywood, who becomes besotted with an idealistic, younger woman, who doesn't fully reciprocate. Her estranged father, in town on business, complicates matters. The book is considered a work of hard-boiled noir. The screenwriter in the story is John Malloy, O'Hara's frequent fictional alter ego.

References

1938 novels
Hollywood novels